Bohdan Adam Bułakowski (born January 11, 1950 in Warsaw, Mazowieckie) is a retired race walker from Poland, who represented his native country at the 1980 Summer Olympics in Moscow, USSR. There he ended up in seventh place in the men's 20 km race, clocking 1:28.36.

References
sports-reference

1950 births
Living people
Polish male racewalkers
Olympic athletes of Poland
Athletes (track and field) at the 1980 Summer Olympics
Athletes from Warsaw
Skra Warszawa athletes